Treburgie is a hamlet in the civil parish of Dobwalls, Cornwall, England, United Kingdom.

References

Hamlets in Cornwall